A by-election was held for the New South Wales Legislative Assembly electorate of Coogee on 8 May 1948 because of the death of Lou Cunningham. The Labor candidate was his widow Catherine.

Dates

Results

Lou Cunningham died.

See also
Electoral results for the district of Coogee
List of New South Wales state by-elections

References

1948 elections in Australia
New South Wales state by-elections
1940s in New South Wales
May 1948 events in Australia